Typocerus balteatus is a species of flower longhorn in the beetle family Cerambycidae. It is found in North America.

Subspecies
These two subspecies belong to the species Typocerus balteatus:
 Typocerus balteatus balteatus Lewis, 2001
 Typocerus balteatus diana Lewis, 2001

References

Further reading

External links

 

Lepturinae
Articles created by Qbugbot
Beetles described in 1878